Millhouse Bridge is a footbridge across the River South Tyne at Millhouse, a hamlet just to the south of Bardon Mill in Northumberland.

History
The bridge is of lattice girder design and was constructed in 1883.

References

Bridges in Northumberland
Crossings of the River Tyne